M. Carmen Galan is a Spanish chemist and a Professor of Chemistry at the University of Bristol. Her research considers bioinspired probes for the targeting and regulation of cellular processes. She was awarded the Royal Society of Chemistry Jeremy Knowles Award in 2021.

Early life and education 
Galan was born in Spain. She has said that she became interested in science as a child, and fascinated by medicine whilst at high school. She earned a Licenciatura in chemistry at the University of Alicante. Galan was a doctoral researcher in the University of Georgia, where she worked with Geert-Jan Boons on carbohydrates. Her doctorate involved the use of conformationally constructed N-acetyl lactosamine derivatives. After graduating she moved to the Scripps Research Institute, working in the laboratory of Chi-Huey Wong. She spent two years at the Scripps before moving to Massachusetts Institute of Technology, where she joined the group of Sarah O'Connor and worked on natural product synthesis.

Research and career 
In 2006 Galan returned to the United Kingdom, where she joined the University of Bristol as a lecturer in chemistry. Her research considers carbohydrate synthesis, glycan-based nanomaterials and oligosaccharides. An understanding of glycan-based structures and their interactions is expected to help with the design and development of therapeutic tools.

Galan was named editor-in-chief of the Elsevier journal Carbohydrate Research in 2017.

Awards and honours 

 2008 Wellcome Trust Value in People Award
 2008 Royal Society Dorothy Hodgkin Fellowship
 2011 Engineering and Physical Sciences Research Council Career Acceleration Fellowship
 2015 European Research Council Consolidator Investigator
 2017 Royal Society of Chemistry and Dextra Carbohydrate Chemistry Award 
 2021 Elected Fellow of the Royal Society of Chemistry
 2021 Royal Society of Chemistry Jeremy Knowles Award

Select publications

References 

Living people
Spanish chemists
Academics of the University of Bristol
University of Alicante alumni
Academic journal editors
University of Georgia alumni
Spanish women chemists
Year of birth missing (living people)